The Saint's Return (released in the US as The Saint's Girl Friday) is a British crime thriller film from 1953, produced by Hammer Film Productions in London.

It premiered in London under the original title on 12 October 1953 and was distributed in the UK by Hammer Films own distribution company, Exclusive Films.  It was released in the US by RKO under the US title on 15 April 1954. The Saint's Return saw Louis Hayward, who had been the first actor to play Simon Templar in The Saint in New York in 1938, fifteen years earlier, return to the role one last time.

Plot
A female friend asks the Saint for help and ends up dead. The Saint sets about investigating and discovers the involvement of the River Mob, a gangster organisation involved with a gambling barge. The Saint is helped by Carol Denby, who is being used by the gangster.

Cast
 Louis Hayward - Simon Templar/The Saint
 Naomi Chance - Carol Denby
 Sydney Tafler - Max Lennar
 Charles Victor - Chief Insp. Claud Teal
 Jane Carr - Kate Finch
 Harold Lang - Jarvis
 William Russell - Keith Merton (as Russell Enoch)
 Diana Dors - The Blonde in Lennar's Apartment
 Fred Johnson - Irish Cassidy
 Thomas Gallagher - Hoppy, his valet
 Russell Napier - Col. Stafford
 Sam Kydd - Barkley (Joe Podd)
 Ian Fleming as Lord Merton

Production
Although based upon Charteris' character, the film was an original work by British screenwriter Allan MacKinnon and not based directly on any of Charteris' stories. Charteris, however, had a percentage interest in the film. It is the first filmed Saint production to feature the character of Hoppy Uniatz, Templar's assistant in the 1940s-era Saint books.  Percy Herbert later played the character in at least one episode of the 1960s TV series.

Hayward's casting was announced in January 1953. He was originally going to England to make No Escape but that film was actually made in Hollywood. It was Hayward's first film in England since The Lady and the Bandit.

In March 1953 as filming was being completed the title was changed from The Saint's Queen to The Saint's Return.

It was the second film Dors made for Hammer after The Last Page. In September 1953 producer Julian Lesser had signed Dors to make two more movies.

Reception

Critical reception
The Los Angeles Times said it had "unusually good suspense elements with Hayward competently leading the way".

Derek Winnert called it "a very watchable British stab at reviving the series", adding that "with its neat plot and decent sly sense of humour, it is entirely entertaining, if only mildly". Of the actors, he wrote: "An ideal Hayward is aloofly smooth and suitably chilly in a role he created in the original film", concluding that "there’s a really good true Brit cast to support him".

Box office
This was the first Saint film to be released in ten years, following RKO's The Saint series 1938-1943, and Hammer Films had hopes to revive the series, but this did not occur. In 1960, a French-Italian film entitled Le Saint mène la danse, with Felix Marten playing The Saint, was released with very limited success. It was not until 1962 and the TV series The Saint, starring Roger Moore, that the character achieved lasting success beyond the literary world. The next English-language cinema film featuring the character wouldn't be released until 1997, with Val Kilmer playing the character in The Saint.

References

External links
 
The Saint's Return at TCMDB
The Saint's Return at BFI
Review of film at Variety

1953 films
The Saint (Simon Templar)
Hammer Film Productions films
British crime thriller films
Films directed by Seymour Friedman
Films set in London
1950s crime thriller films
British black-and-white films
1950s English-language films
1950s British films